Several wingless hexapods are known as bristletails:

Class Insecta
 Order Archaeognatha (or Microcoryphia) — insect order that includes the jumping bristletails and rock bristletails
 Order Zygentoma — insect order that includes silverfish, firebrats, and allies

Class Entognatha
Order Diplura — the two-pronged bristletails

Other
 Thysanura — deprecated insect order of silverfish and allies, now separated into Zygentoma and Archeognatha

Animal common name disambiguation pages